Daydreaming is the stream of consciousness that detaches from current, external tasks when attention drifts to a more personal and internal direction. This phenomenon is common in people's daily life shown by a large-scale study in which participants spend 47% of their waking time on average on daydreaming. There are various names of this phenomenon including mind wandering, fantasy, spontaneous thoughts, etc. Daydreaming is the term used by Jerome L. Singer whose research laid the foundation for nearly all the subsequent research today. The terminologies assigned by researchers today puts challenges on identifying the common features of daydreaming, and on building collective work among researchers.

There are many types of daydreams, and there is no consistent definition among psychologists. However, the characteristic that is common to all forms of daydreaming meets the criteria for mild dissociation. Also, the impacts of different types of daydreams are not identical. While some are disruptive and deleterious, others may be beneficial in some way.

Functions of daydreaming 
Mooneyham and Schooler summarized five potential functions daydreaming serves: future thinking, creative thinking, attentional cycling, dishabituation and relief from boredom.

Daydreaming can be a useful tool to help keep people mindful of their relevant goals, such as imagining future success of a goal to motivate accomplishing a difficult or uninteresting task.

Creative thinking is another function of daydreaming associated with increased creativity. The frequency of daydreaming is the highest during undemanding and easy tasks. It is hypothesized that daydreaming plays an important role in generating creative problem-solving processes. Studies have also found that intentional daydreaming is more effective when focused on creative thought processing, rather than spontaneous or disruptive daydreams.

Attentional cycling is an adaptive function of daydreaming that helps to keep people's behaviors relatively optimal when there are multiple target problems at the same time. When people have many goals, daydreaming provides an opportunity for people to switch among different streams of information and thoughts.

Dishabituation is beneficial when the internal response to the external stimulus decreases as the external stimulus repeats during learning process. One research identified this effect in learning and showed that learning is more effective with distributed practices rather than massed practices. Daydreaming can provide the opportunity to allow thoughts to drift away from intensive learning temporarily and to focus again with the refreshed capability to continue focusing on attention-demanding tasks.

Relief from boredom is another function of daydreaming. When people are doing boring tasks, daydreaming allows their thoughts to detach from current external tasks to relieve boredom. At the same time, this temporary detachment will not stop external activities completely when these activities are necessary. Also, daydreaming can cause the perception that time moves more quickly.

Daydreaming can also be used to imagine social situations. Humans are naturally oriented to be social in behavior and actively seek the approval and company of others. Social daydreaming is imagining past social occurrences and future events and conversations. According to research, daydreaming and social cognition have strong overlapping similarities when activated portions of the brain are observed. These findings indicate that daydreaming is an extension of the brain's experience of social cognition. This is likely because daydreams are often focused on the mental representations of social events, experiences, and people. It was also observed that a large portion of implicitly occurring daydreams, approximately 71%, were social. According to recent research, it was also found that positive rumination caused increases in the imagining of positive future events. Negative rumination caused an increase in thoughts of negative future events in depressed individuals but did not cause a significant increase in thoughts of negative future events in those who were not depressed.

Default mode network 

According to several studies, daydreaming appears to be the brain's default setting when no other external task is occupying its attention. A group of regions in the brain called the default mode network is lit up only when the brain is left in a sort of ‘idle’ state. These areas of the brain light up in sequence only when daydreaming.

Functional theories 
There has yet to be a consensus on how the process of mind wandering occurs. Three theories have been devised to explain the occurrences and reasons behind why people daydream. These theories are the distractibility account, executive-function account, and the decoupling account.

The distractibility account theorizes that distracting stimulus, whether internal or external, reflects a failure to disregard or control distractions in the mind. According to this theory, the brain activity increases in response to an increase in attention to mind-wandering and the mind tends to dwell on task unrelated thoughts (TUT's).

The executive-function account theorizes that the mind fails to correctly process task relevant events. This theory is based on the observation of TUT causes an increase in errors regarding task focused thinking, especially tasks requiring executive control.

The decoupling account suggests that attention becomes removed, or decoupled, from perceptual information involving an external task, and couples to an internal process. In this process, TUT is enhanced as internal thoughts are disengaged from surrounding distractions as the participant ‘tunes out’ the surrounding environment.

Psychological studies
 Freudian psychology interpreted daydreaming as expression of the repressed instincts similarly to those revealing themselves in nighttime dreams. He pointed out that, in contrast to nighttime dreams, there seems to be a process of "secondary revision" in fantasies that makes them more lucid, like daydreaming. The state of daydreaming is a kind of liminal state between waking (with the ability to think rationally and logically) and sleeping.

In the late 1960s, cognitive psychologists Jerome L. Singer of Yale University and John S. Antrobus of the City College of New York, created a daydream questionnaire, called the Imaginal Processes Inventory (IPI). It has been used to investigate daydreams. Psychologists Leonard Giambra and George Huba used the IPI and found that daydreamers' imaginary images vary in three ways: how vivid or enjoyable the daydreams are, how many guilt- or fear-filled daydreams they have, and how "deeply" into the daydream people go.

Humanistic psychology on other hand, found numerous examples of people in creative or artistic careers, such as composers, novelists and filmmakers, developing new ideas through daydreaming. Similarly, research scientists, mathematicians and artists have developed new ideas by daydreaming about their subject areas.

Self-reflection 
Daydreaming can also be used to reveal personal aspects about an individual. In an experiment directed by Robert Desoille, Desoille had a subject rest on a couch and then invited them to daydream about a series of objects and events. The subjects were asked to imagine a sword or vase first, then to imagine climbing a mountain, and then ascending into space. The subject is then asked to visualize a wizard, a witch, and a dragon. Subjects who imagine more details and sleek objects often see themselves as more useful and hold a belief they are capable of growth. Through the daydream, which can involve many fantastical elements, characteristics such as a fear of men or a desire to subdue a selfish personality trait can be revealed.

Self-focused daydreaming can be beneficial/positive (i.e. a self-reflection) or detrimental/negative (i.e. a rumination). Rumination is over-thinking negative experiences from the past, and pessimistic views of the future; it generally increases negative mood-episodes, guilt, fear and poor attention controls Self-reflection generally increases happiness, anti-depressant thinking, rational planning, creativity, and positivism.

Research
Eric Klinger's research in the 1980s showed that most daydreams are about ordinary, everyday events and help to remind us of mundane tasks. Klinger's research also showed that over 75% of workers in "boring jobs", such as lifeguards and truck drivers, use vivid daydreams to "ease the boredom" of their routine tasks.

Israeli high school students who scored high on the Daydreaming Scale of the IPI had more empathy than students who scored low. Some psychologists use the mental imagery created during their clients' daydreaming to help gain insight into their mental state and make diagnoses.

Research with fMRI shows that brain areas associated with complex problem-solving become activated during daydreaming episodes.

Benefits and costs
Mooneyham and Schooler reviewed studies about daydreaming published from 1995. Some of the major costs of daydreaming summarized by the review are worse performances with reading, sustained attention, mood etc.

The negative consequences of daydreaming on reading performance have been studied the most thoroughly. Research shows that there is a negative correlation between daydreaming frequency and reading comprehension performance, specifically worsened item-specific comprehension and model-building ability.

Disruptive daydreams or spontaneous daydreaming is also characteristic of people with attention-deficit hyperactive disorder (ADHD).

Negative mood is another association of daydreaming. Research finds people generally report lower happiness when they are daydreaming than when they are not. For the positive daydreaming, people report the same happiness rating between current tasks and pleasant things they are more likely to daydream about. This finding remains true across all activities. The relationship between mood and daydreaming from time-lag analysis is that the latter comes first.

In the late 19th century, Toni Nelson argued that some daydreams with grandiose fantasies are self-gratifying attempts at "wish fulfillment". In the 1950s, some educational psychologists warned parents not to let their children daydream, for fear that the children may be sucked into "neurosis and even psychosis".

While the cost of daydreaming is more thoroughly discussed, the associated benefit is understudied. One potential reason is the payoff of daydreaming is usually private and hidden compared to the measurable cost from external goal-directed tasks. It is hard to know and record people's private thoughts such as personal goals and dreams, so whether daydreaming supports these thoughts is difficult to discuss.

Immordino et al. identified a benefit of daydreaming. They argued that the mind is not idle during daydreaming, though it is at rest when not attentively engaging in external tasks. Rather, during this process, people indulge themselves in and reflect on fantasies, memories, future goals and psychological selves while still being able to control enough attention to keep easy tasks going and monitor the external environment. Thus, the potential benefits are the skills of internal reflection developed in daydreaming to connect emotional implication of daily life experience with personal meaning building process.

Despite the detrimental impact of daydreaming on aptitude tests which most educational institutions put heavy emphasis on, Immrdino et al. argued that it is important for children to get internal reflection skills from daydreaming. Research shows that children equipped with these skills have higher academic ability and are socially and emotionally better off.

See also
 Creative visualization
 Creative Writers and Day-Dreaming
 Fantasy prone personality
 Fantasy (psychology)
 Maladaptive daydreaming
 Mind-wandering
 Stream of consciousness (psychology)

References

External links
 Psychology Today blog on Power of Daydreaming by Amy Fries
 Daydreams at Work: Wake-Up Your Creative Powers by Amy Fries
 Positive effects of daydreaming
 Daydreaming improves thinking (Cosmos Magazine)
 Site summarising research on mind-wandering and daydreaming

Psychological adjustment
Imagination
Abstraction
Intrapersonal communication